Spring Up is the debut extended play by South Korean boy band Astro. The album was released digitally and physically on February 23, 2016 by Fantagio. The album contains five tracks with the lead single, "Hide & Seek" and second single "Cat's Eye".

Background and release
In mid-January 2016, Fantagio announced that Astro would release a debut EP on February 23. On February 11, 2016, the first teaser video for the album was posted, presenting members of the group. On February 15, 2016, the "Highlight Video" was posted, presenting all the songs on the album. On February 18, 2016, the first music video teaser was posted. On February 22, 2016, the music video for the title track "Hide & Seek" was released and on February 25, 2016, the music video for "Cat's Eye" was released.

Promotion
Astro held a live showcase on February 22-23, where they performed "Hide & Seek" along with dance track "Cat's Eye" and ballad tracks "First Love" and "Morning Call".

The group started promoting their title track "Hide & Seek" with the b-side "Cat's Eye" on music shows on February 25. They first performed the songs on MBC M's Show Champion, followed by performances on Mnet's M! Countdown, KBS' Music Bank, MBC's Show! Music Core and SBS's Inkigayo.

The EP also appeared in the Billboard World Album (2016) chart, landing in #6 and it lasted for two weeks on the weeks of March 12 and March 19. This garnered their debut success as thousands of fans from around the world recognized the group.

Track listing

Charts

Weekly

Monthly

Year-end

Sales and certifications

Release history

References

2016 debut EPs
Astro (South Korean band) albums
Korean-language EPs
Interpark Music EPs